The Men's United States Squash Open 2012 is the men's edition of the 2012 United States Open (squash), which is a PSA World Series event Gold (Prize money: $115,000). The event took place at the Daskalakis Athletic Center in Philadelphia, Pennsylvania in the United States from 6 October to 12 October. Ramy Ashour won his first US Open trophy, beating Grégory Gaultier in the final.

Prize money and ranking points
For 2012, the prize purse was $115,000. The prize money and points breakdown is as follows:

Seeds

Draw and results

See also
United States Open (squash)
PSA World Series 2012
Women's United States Open (squash) 2012

References

External links
PSA US Open 2012 website
US Squash Open official website
US Squash Open 2012 Squashinfo website

Squash tournaments in the United States
Men's US Open
Men's US Open
2012 in sports in Pennsylvania
Squash in Pennsylvania